Pierre Vaultier (born 24 June 1987) is a French two-time Olympic Gold Champion, and one-time World Gold Champion snowboarder, specializing in snowboard cross.

Career
Vaultier started snowboarding at the age of six at Serre Chevalier, one of the major French ski resorts located in the southern part of the Alps. He debuted competition in 1997. He joined the young French team in 2004 and then the older team one year later. He operated in the "Ecrins Snowboard" club of Puy-Saint-Vincent in 2005. He participated in the 2006 Winter Olympics in Turino and at the X Games in 2007. On 13 March 2008 he won the crystal globe in snowboarding by finishing second in the final round of the 2007–08 FIS Snowboard World CupWorld Cup at Chiesa in Valmalenco. On 13 December 2008 he slipped during training at Serre Chevalier and suffered a lumbar fracture. After undergoing surgery in Grenoble, he missed the majority of the season but was the leader in following World Cup in Chapelco, Argentina.

2010: return and climb
After the 2009 season marked by his injury, Vaultier began the World Cup 2010 at Chapelco with a victory before Seth Wescott. Since then he added three more victories to this winter at Telluride, Veysonnaz and in Quebec at Stoneham, as well as a second place at Bad Gastein. He was a designated favorite at the 2010 Winter Olympics in Vancouver.

2014: Sochi
Two months after tearing his anterior cruciate ligament (ACL), Vaultier won the gold medal in the snowboard cross at the 2014 Winter Olympics in Sochi.

2018: Pyeongchang
After surviving a crash in the semifinals of the 2018 Winter Olympics in Pyeongchang to finish in the third and final qualifying place, Vaultier surged ahead of the pack in the final to win gold. This was his second gold medal in the Olympic snowboard cross.

References

External links
 
 
 
 
 
 

1987 births
Living people
People from Briançon
Snowboarders at the 2006 Winter Olympics
Snowboarders at the 2010 Winter Olympics
Snowboarders at the 2014 Winter Olympics
Snowboarders at the 2018 Winter Olympics
Olympic snowboarders of France
French male snowboarders
Olympic gold medalists for France
Olympic medalists in snowboarding
Medalists at the 2014 Winter Olympics
Medalists at the 2018 Winter Olympics
Sportspeople from Hautes-Alpes
21st-century French people